Elisa Camiscioli (born 1967) is an American historian specialized in immigration to and from France, sex trafficking, and race and sexual politics in modern France and its empire. In 2008, she became an associate professor of history at Binghamton University. She authored  Camiscioli was co-editor of the Journal of Women's History from 2015 to 2020.

Camiscioli completed a B.A., cum laude, at University of Pennsylvania in 1989. She took undergraduate courses in history at Paris Diderot University from 1987 to 1988. Camiscioli earned a M.A. (1991) and Ph.D. (2000) from the University of Chicago.

References

External links 

 

Living people
1967 births
Place of birth missing (living people)
American women historians
21st-century American women writers
21st-century American historians
Historians of France
University of Pennsylvania alumni
University of Chicago alumni
Binghamton University faculty